The 1949 Cal Poly Mustangs football team represented California Polytechnic State College—now known as California Polytechnic State University, San Luis Obispo—as a member of the California Collegiate Athletic Association (CCAA) during the 1949 college football season. Led by Chuck Pavelko his second and final season as head coach, Cal Poly compiled an overall record of 4–6 with a mark of 1–3 in conference play, tying for third place in the CCAA. The Mustangs played home games at Mustang Stadium in San Luis Obispo, California.

Schedule

Notes

References

Cal Poly
Cal Poly Mustangs football seasons
Cal Poly Mustangs football